Sphaleractis is a genus of moth in the family Gelechiidae.

Species
 Sphaleractis platyleuca (Lower, 1897)
 Sphaleractis eurysema Meyrick, 1904
 Sphaleractis epiclysta Meyrick, 1920
 Sphaleractis parasticta Meyrick, 1904

References

Gelechiinae